The Nagode Trial was a political show trial in Slovenia, Yugoslavia in 1947.

The trial was carried out by the Slovene authorities under the leadership of the Communist Party of Slovenia against non-communist politicians that wished to participate in politics in Slovenia after 1945. In May 1947 the Slovenian secret police (UDBA) arrested 32 highly educated intellectuals. These included some former members of the  Communist Party of Slovenia, but the majority were liberal democrats that were inclined toward western-style parliamentary democracy. Those arrested included Črtomir Nagode, Ljubo Sirc, Leon Kavčnik, Boris Furlan, Zoran Hribar, Angela Vode, Metod Kumelj, Pavla Hočevar, Svatopluk Zupan, Bogdan Stare, Metod Pirc, Vid Lajovic, Franjo Sirc, and Elizabeta Hribar, and during the trial Franc Snoj was added to the group. They were interrogated and tortured for two months in Ljubljana's prisons. The Politburo of the Central Committee of the Communist Party of Slovenia used the Slovene media to characterize those arrested as "a handful of spies, class enemies, foreign paid agents, who have no political program and whose work, with no political value at all, is to damage the people's authority." The trial against the accused began on July 29, and the proceedings were broadcast to the public via special loudspeakers on the streets. The public prosecutor in the trial was Viktor Avbelj, later a president of the presidency of the Socialist Republic of Slovenia, and Drago Supančič was used as an incriminating witness. The trial became known as the "Nagode trial" after the principal defendant. After 13 days of hearings, on August 12 three of the defendants (Nagode, Boris Furlan, and Ljubo Sirc) were sentenced to be shot, and the remainder were sentenced to lengthy prison sentences with forced labor, deprivation of all civil rights, and confiscation of their property. Nagode was shot on August 27, 1947 and the death sentences against Furlan and Sirc were commuted to 20 years in prison. Two of those sentenced committed suicide.

In 1991 the Supreme Court of the Republic of Slovenia overturned the conviction against Nagode and his fourteen co-defendants on the grounds that it was based on false testimony and that it had been a corrupt trial against imaginary Western spies.

Notes and references

Notes

References

See also 

 Dachau trials (Slovenia)

Trials of political people
Trials in Slovenia
Political repression in Communist Yugoslavia
Political and cultural purges
Yugoslav Slovenia
Political history of Slovenia
1947 in Slovenia
1947 in Yugoslavia
Trials in Yugoslavia